Tarsia is a town in southwestern Italy. It may also refer to: 

 Antonio Tarsia, 17th- and 18th-century Italian sculptor
 Antonio Tarsia (composer), 17th- and 18th-century Italian composer
 Joseph Tarsia, recording engineer
 39564 Tarsia, an asteroid
 Tarsia (Bithynia), historical region in modern Turkey